Chaker Bargaoui (born 4 April 1983) is a Tunisian former footballer who played as a midfielder.

Career
Born in Siliana, Bargaoui played for CS Sfaxien, CA Bizertin and Stade Tunisien.

He earned 2 caps for the Tunisian national team between 2010 and 2011.

References

1983 births
Living people
Tunisian footballers
Tunisia international footballers
CS Sfaxien players
CA Bizertin players
Stade Tunisien players
Tunisian Ligue Professionnelle 1 players
Association football midfielders